Michaela Seibold (born 15 August 1975) is a German former professional tennis player.

Seibold, who grew up in the Schleswig-Holstein town of Kuddewörde, reached a career high singles ranking of 223 while competing on the professional tour in the 1990s. Her only WTA Tour main draw appearance came in doubles, partnering Maja Palaveršić at the 1995 Amelia Island Championships.

ITF finals

Singles: 3 (1–2)

Doubles: 6 (4–2)

References

External links
 
 

1975 births
Living people
German female tennis players
Sportspeople from Schleswig-Holstein
People from Herzogtum Lauenburg